Francis West (1586–1633/4) was the deputy governor of the Colony and Dominion of Virginia.

Francis West may also refer to:

Francis West (bishop) (1908–1999), Bishop of Taunton in the Church of England
Francis West (colonel) (1711–1796), Sheriff of King William County in the Colony and Dominion of Virginia and its representative in the House of Burgesses
Francis H. West (1825–1896), Union Army general
Bing West (Francis J. West, born 1940), American military writer and former Defense Department official

See also
Frank West (disambiguation)
Francis Weston (1511–1536), courtier executed for alleged adultery with Queen Anne Boleyn